Dennis Eugene Hamilton (May 8, 1944 – June 18, 2012) was an American basketball player.  He played in the National Basketball Association and American Basketball Association from 1967 to 1971.

Hamilton, a 6'8" forward from Huntington Beach High School in Huntington Beach, California, played collegiately at the Arizona State University from 1963 to 1966.  For his career, he scored 1,079 points (13.6 per game) and shot .813 from the free throw line.  He was named second team All-Western Athletic Conference in 1966.

Undrafted after the completion of his college career, Hamilton signed as a free agent with the Los Angeles Lakers for the 1967–68 NBA season.  For the season he averaged 2.8 points and 1.6 rebounds per game for a team that made it to the 1968 NBA Finals.  Following the season, Hamilton was selected by the Phoenix Suns in the 1968 NBA Expansion Draft, then traded to the Atlanta Hawks for the 1968–69 NBA season.  Hamilton then played two years in the American Basketball Association, for the Pittsburgh Pipers and Kentucky Colonels.  For his NBA/ABA career he averaged 4.6 points and 3.1 rebounds per game.

Hamilton died on June 18, 2012.

References

External links
Career Stats

1944 births
2012 deaths
American men's basketball players
Arizona State Sun Devils men's basketball players
Atlanta Hawks players
Basketball players from California
Kentucky Colonels players
Los Angeles Lakers players
Phoenix Suns expansion draft picks
Pittsburgh Pipers players
Power forwards (basketball)
Sportspeople from Huntington Beach, California
Undrafted National Basketball Association players